Al-Zaitounah (meaning "the Olive") is a Palestinian town in the Ramallah and al-Bireh Governorate. It was formed in 2005 as the result of a merger of the villages of Abu Shukheidim and al-Mazra'a al-Qibliya. In 2007, al-Zaitounah had a population of 6,190, according to the Palestinian Central Bureau of Statistics.

Location
It is bordered by Bir Zeit and Abu Qash  to the east, Kobar and the settlement of Nahliel to the north, Al-Itihad and Al Janiya  to the west, and 'Ein Qiniya, Ramallah and Al Janiya to the south.

History
  
Al-Zaitounah was formed in 2005 as the result of a merger of the villages of Abu Shukheidim and al-Mazra'a al-Qibliya.

After the Oslo II Accord, 54.2% of Al-Zaitounah’s land was classified as Area B land, while the remaining 45.8% is defined as Area C. Israel has confiscated 308 dunams of land from Al-Zaitounah for the construction of 2 Israeli settlements: 289 dunams for Talmon, while 19 dunams for Nahl'iel.

References

External links
Official website 
Official website 
Survey of Western Palestine, Map 14:  IAA, Wikimedia commons
 AL-Zaytouneh town (fact sheet),   Applied Research Institute–Jerusalem (ARIJ)
 AL-Zaytouneh town profile, (ARIJ)
AL-Zaytouneh  aerial photo, (ARIJ)
Locality Development Priorities and Needs in AL-Zaytouneh Town, (ARIJ)

Towns in the West Bank
Municipalities of the State of Palestine